Giri (also Romanized as Gīrī) is a village in Siyarastaq Yeylaq Rural District, Rahimabad District, Rudsar County, Gilan Province, Iran. At the 2006 census, its population was 157, in 47 families.

References 

Populated places in Rudsar County